St. Matthew's Cathedral, is the Anglican cathedral in Brandon, Manitoba. The cathedral is located in a residential neighbourhood on 13th Street near Victoria Avenue.

Built in between 1912 and 1913 to designs by Brandon architect W.A. (William Alexander)Elliott, whose name is on other designated heritage buildings in Brandon Manitoba such as Johnson House, Christie House, and the Central Firehall. The St. Matthew's Cathedral was designed in English Gothic Revival style, and constructed by the firm of William Bell and Son, the cathedral is a red brick and limestone building, with a complex floor plan, variety of roof lines, crenelations and tall lancet windows. The central tower is located at the crossing and is the focal point of the building. Inside, the cathedral is elegant, with Gothic inspired windows and furnishings, all beautifully maintained.

The Institute for stained glass in Canada has documented the stained glass at St Matthew's Anglican Cathedral.

The cathedral church hosts numerous concerts and events, both secular and religious, which are held throughout the year.

The current Rector and Dean is the Very Reverend Don Bernhardt.

References

External links 
 resource on W.A. (William Alexander) Elliott
 W.A. (William Alexander) Elliott (resource from the Manitoba Historical Society)
 St. Matthew's Cathedral website
 Diocese of Brandon website
 Mystery Worshipper Report from the Ship of Fools website
 Christie House, Brandon Manitoba (Architect W.A. Elliott)
 St. Matthew's Cathedral (Architect W.A. Elliott)
 Central Fire Hall, Brandon Manitoba (Architect W.A. Elliott)
 Johnson House, Brandon Manitoba (Architect W.A. Elliott)
 The Johnson Family of Johnson House

St. Matthew's
Buildings and structures in Brandon, Manitoba
Anglican church buildings in Manitoba
1913 establishments in Manitoba
20th-century Anglican church buildings in Canada